Survival Island, also known as Three, is a 2005 erotic thriller survival film written and directed by Stewart Raffill and starring Billy Zane, Kelly Brook, and Juan Pablo Di Pace.

Plot
Jack and Jennifer are a wealthy couple who are yachting in the Caribbean during Christmas. One of their crew is the handsome Manuel, who is cursed by his angry ex-girlfriend Maria as he prepares to leave on the yacht. He is clearly bothered and has a difficult time fulfilling requests for the crew and guests. After Captain Richards confronts him, Manuel quits and throws down a rag as he storms out of the galley. The rag lands on a gas flame and causes the entire yacht to catch fire. Captain Richards is unable to control the blaze with a fire extinguisher so they abandon ship. Their lifeboats are capsized by a storm later that night and everyone becomes separated.

Washing up on a deserted island, Jennifer is completely alone until she sees the body of Captain Richards in the water. As she attempts to resuscitate him, Manuel appears and also unsuccessfully tries to revive him. They bury his body and under Manuel's guidance, set out to build a hut for shelter and find food. Two days later while fishing near a reef, Manuel finds Jack alive and brings him back to Jennifer and their hut.

Although Jack is grateful at first, he eventually suspects Manuel of having desires on his wife and declares the man his enemy, promising to ruin his life once they get off the island. This puts Jennifer in the uncomfortable position of her loyalty to Jack conflicting with the realization that they both need Manuel's help to survive. A proud man, Jack insists that he can provide for them both, but it quickly becomes apparent that he cannot. Jack and Jennifer's relationship starts quickly deteriorating.

Jack steals Manuel's goggles to go fishing one day and when Manuel discovers this, he threatens to kill Jack. Jennifer attempts to get him to calm down. As the two exit the water after fighting, Manuel pins Jennifer down and starts to rape her as a way of getting revenge on Jack, but she soon stops resisting and the act becomes consensual. Afterwards, Jennifer feels remorse despite having enjoyed the encounter and Manuel confesses his love for her. When Jack returns, Jennifer accidentally hints at him what had happened and he furiously rejects her.

While fishing another day, Jack finds a boat on the ocean floor. He drags it to shore and attempts to repair it. That night, Manuel and Jennifer go for a midnight swim as Jack watches them from a distance. As they start having sex, she gives him the idea of stealing the boat while Jack is out fishing so they can get away together from the island. The following morning, they manage to steal the boat and sail, however they do not get far before the boat begins to sink and they realize that Jack's plan all along was for them to take the boat and drown. They are forced to swim back to the island and to Jack, who attacks the now-exhausted Manuel with a spear and kidnaps Jennifer. Manuel rescues her that night but gets wounded in the process and becomes sick.

The next day, Jack tracks down the pair and finds them on top of a branch of a tree. He throws one of his spears to a now-weakened Manuel, who loses his balance and falls to the ground. Before Jack could kill him, Jennifer pins Jack to the ground, attempting to kill him with his own knife. Manuel picks up a heavy rock with which to crush Jack but he loses his balance again and falls backward, impaling himself on one of Jack's spears. Simultaneously, Maria performs a voodoo ceremony and impales Manuel's effigy on a spike.

One year later, a yachting family drops anchor near the island and explores it, discovering Jennifer asleep in her hut. She, still somewhat distraught over Manuel's death, leaves with them, but does not mention that Jack, who she has been forced to live with and depend on since Manuel's death, is also on the island. Jack, who is fishing, sees her leaving on the yacht and calls out, but Jennifer, who had also stolen his lighter so he could not make any more fires, finally exacts revenge on him by ignoring him and the family inside the boat cannot hear him. Jack is abandoned on the island and his eventual fate is left ambiguous.

Cast
 Billy Zane as Jack
 Kelly Brook as Jennifer
 Juan Pablo Di Pace as Manuel
 Maria Victoria Di Pace as Maria
 Todd Collins as Bill
 Gabrielle Jourdan as Gail
 Gary Brockette as Captain Richards
 Isabelle Constantini as Maggie Richards

Production
The film was produced during 2003 and was originally set for cinema release under the title Three in 2004. Principal photography started in April 2004 at Eleuthera in the Bahamas and lasted for seven weeks. In 2005, Billy Zane and Kelly Brook unsuccessfully challenged the film's producers to remove Brook's nude scenes from the movie.

Release

Theatrical
Survival Island went on limited theatrical release on 3 May 2006 in the United Kingdom before being released to DVD on 21 August 2006. The cinematic release lasted for just one week in many cinemas.

Home media
Survival Island was released on DVD in the United States on 15 August 2006. It was also released theatrically in a number of European countries under its original title, Three. Actors Billy Zane and Kelly Brook met during the course of filming in 2004 and later became engaged. In 2005, Zane and Brook unsuccessfully challenged the film's producers to remove Brook's nude scenes from the movie. However, the eventual DVD release kept these scenes intact.

Reception

Critical response
Survival Island received mostly negative reviews. On Rotten Tomatoes, the film has an approval rating of  based on reviews from  critics.

Three as it was known in the UK suffered from poor reviews, gaining a rare one-star rating on the BBC Movies website. Robert Hanks of The Independent said "[Three is] an unholy amalgam of Lord of the Flies, The Blue Lagoon and The Admirable Crichton ... At odd moments it rises to risibility, but mostly it is just dull". In a review for Empire, Adam Smith described the film as "appalling". Anna Smith of Time Out criticized the film's tone in her review saying, "the dramatic score and writhing sex scenes imply an erotic thriller, but the camera treats pneumatic Brook like the subject of a cheap porno and the plot bears little resemblance to either genre. As the survivors bicker and allegiances change, it’s hard to fathom their motivation or to glean what allegiances we, the audience, are expected to make". Total Film rated it one star out of five, while Patrick Mullen of Medium gave the film a rating of 3/10.

Accolades
Wins
 Golden Trailer Awards: Golden Trailer – Trashiest (2006)

References

External links
 
 

2005 films
2005 thriller drama films
2000s erotic drama films
2000s erotic thriller films
2005 independent films
Adultery in films
American erotic thriller films
American thriller drama films
American erotic drama films
American independent films
British erotic thriller films
British thriller drama films
British erotic drama films
British independent films
English-language Luxembourgian films
2000s English-language films
Films about survivors of seafaring accidents or incidents
Films set in the Caribbean
Films set on uninhabited islands
Films directed by Stewart Raffill
Films about rape
2000s survival films
Films scored by Richard Harvey
2005 drama films
2000s American films
2000s British films